Llanfair Waterdine is a civil parish in Shropshire, England.  It contains 30 listed buildings that are recorded in the National Heritage List for England.  All the listed buildings are designated at Grade II, the lowest of the three grades, which is applied to "buildings of national importance and special interest".  The parish contains the village of Llanfair Waterdine and the hamlet of Skyborry Green, and is otherwise entirely rural.  Most of the listed buildings are houses and associated structures, cottages, farmhouses and farm buildings, a high proportion of which are timber framed, some also with cruck construction, dating from the 14th to the 18th century.  The other listed buildings are a bridge, a church, and memorials in the churchyard.


Buildings

References

Citations

Sources

Lists of buildings and structures in Shropshire